Ringstad is a village in Gran Municipality in Innlandet county, Norway.

Ringstad and its neighboring village of Gran have grown together through conurbation and Statistics Norway has considered them as one, single urban settlement for many years.

References

Gran, Norway
Villages in Innlandet